Schollach is a town in the Wachau valley in the district of Melk in the Austrian state of Lower Austria. It contains the Schallaburg Castle.

Population

References

Cities and towns in Melk District